Patrick Calhoun (11 June 1727– 15 January 1796), was born in County Donegal, Ireland, but emigrated to Virginia with his parents in 1733, and from there the family made their way to South Carolina. According to A Compendium of Irish Biography (1878):

His great-grandson and namesake was the entrepreneur Patrick Calhoun.

References

External links
http://homepages.rootsweb.ancestry.com
 

1727 births
1796 deaths
Calhoun family
Irish soldiers
People from County Donegal
18th-century Irish people
Fathers of vice presidents of the United States